{{Speciesbox
|genus = Namibiocesa
|species = barbata
|authority = (Munro, 1929)
|display_parents = 3
|synonyms = *Leucothrix barbata Munro, 1929
}}Namibiocesa barbata''' is a species of tephritid or fruit flies in the genus Namibiocesa'' of the family Tephritidae.

Distribution
Namibia.

References

Tephritinae
Insects described in 1929
Diptera of Africa